William Wilson (born 1915) was an English professional footballer who played as a right half.

Career
Born in Sheffield, Wilson played for Lopham Street WMC, Bradford City and Newark Town. For Bradford City, he made 1 appearance in the Football League.

Sources

References

1915 births
Year of death missing
English footballers
Bradford City A.F.C. players
Newark Town F.C. players
English Football League players
Association football wing halves